Landmeister in Livland was a high office in the Teutonic Order. The Landmeister administered the Livonia of the Teutonic Order. 
These lands had fallen to the Teutonic Order in 1237 by the incorporation of the former Livonian Brothers of the Sword. The seat of the Landmeister was castle  Wenden. The Landmaster's function in Livonia lasted until 1561, when in aftermath of Livonian War the last Landmeister Gotthard Kettler relinquished the northern parts of the Mastery and in the Union of Vilna secularized the part still left to him and, as the Duchy of Courland and Semigallia, took fief from the Polish king and Grand Duke of Lithuania Sigismund II Augustus. The non-recognition of this act by Pope, Holy Roman Empire and the Grand Master of the Teutonic Order had no factual effect.

History 

The office of the Livonian Landmaster was the successor to the Lord Master of the Order of the Sword Brothers. With the integration of the remains of the Order of the Sword Brothers in 1236 in the aftermath of the Battle of Saule  into the Teutonic Order, the land master of Prussia, Hermann Balk, in 1237 in personal union for the first time took over position of the Landmeister in Livland. It was also decided that this procedure should remain the exception of the rule in the future. 
Owing to the geographical distance between Livonia and Prussia, as well as regional peculiarities in governing the country, Landmeister, elected by the Livonian General Chapter  and confirmed only by the Grand Master of the Teutonic Order, has always maintained a degree of autonomy within the State of the Teutonic Order. Although from 1309 to 1525 the relocation of the seat of the Grand Master to the  Marienburg or to  Königsberg is also the center of religious rule in the relatively near Prussia was the masterpiece Livonia always politically and militarily retained a special status and was often referred to as Livonian Order.

In Livonia existed, in contrast to Prussia, a division of the spheres of influence between the religious power and various autonomous bishoprics. This unusual power constellation was based on the Order of the Sword Brothers heritage.

In addition came the different origin of the cadres of the both branches of the Order: while in Prussia predominantly Central and West German religious ruled, the corps of the Livonian Order branch recruited predominantly from North German and Danish knights. This reflected the country's attachment to the traditions of forcible proselytizing of Livonians and Estonians at the beginning of the 13th century: Christianity spread in the northern Baltic through pre-Hanseatic sea connections from bases such as Lübeck and the Danish  Zealand.

Coordinated activities of both branches in the war against the Grand Duchy of Lithuania remained the exception in view of this constellation. An outstanding example is the absence of the entire Livonian Order in the decisive campaign of 1410, which led to the catastrophe in the  Battle of Tannenberg. The Livonian Landmeister Conrad von Vytinghove relied on a truce agreed with the Lithuanian Grand Duke Vytautas.

The most important landlord in Livonia was Wolter von Plettenberg (1494-1535) due to his victory over the invasion army of the Russian Grand Duke Ivan III. In 1503 and his pragmatic approach to the introduction of the Reformation in Livonia. He himself, like his successors until 1561, remained Catholic even after the Reformation, but under him the Reformation prevailed in Livonia among Baltic Germans, Estonians and Latvians. The Protestant faith has survived to this day in Estonia and Latvia.

See also 
List of Landmeister in Livland
Landmeister of Prussia

References

Literature 
 Peter of Dusburg:  Chronicon Terrae Prussiae  (c. 1326).
 Nikolaus von Jeroschin:  Di Kronike of Pruzinlant  (transfer of  Chronicon Terrae Prussae  into East German with additions, around 1340).
 Hermann von Wartberge:  Chronicon Livoniae  (around 1378)
 Wigand von Marburg:  Chronicon Livoniae  (around 1378)

Teutonic Order
Masters of the Livonian Order